Sir Coles John Jeremy Child, 3rd Baronet (20 September 1944 – 7 March 2022) was a British actor.

Early life
Coles John Jeremy Child was born on 20 September 1944 in Woking, Surrey, son of Foreign Office diplomat Sir Coles John Child, 2nd Baronet, DL, a Major in the Coldstream Guards and aide-de-camp to the Governor General and Commander-in-Chief of Canada from 1931 to 1933, and Sheila, daughter of Hugh Mathewson, of Pine Avenue, Montreal, Quebec, Canada. The Coles family were lords of the manor of Bromley, and lived at Bromley Palace. He was educated at Wellesley House School, a preparatory school in the coastal town of Broadstairs in Kent and at Eton College and Aiglon College, then spent a year at Poitiers University, followed by training as a child actor at the Bristol Old Vic Theatre School.

Career
Having for a short time been a "reluctant" City broker, after appearing in repertory theatre, Child was cast in a significant role in the 1967 film Privilege. Following this appearance, he played over 90 different roles in films and television, including a small role in the film Quadrophenia; as Piers Leigh in the miniseries Edward & Mrs. Simpson; as one of the main villains in Bird of Prey; as Tory politician Charles Gurney Seymour in the television adaptation of Jeffrey Archer's First Among Equals, and a cameo in A Fish Called Wanda. From 1977 to 1978, he appeared in the second series of Backs to the Land. He also played a typical officer-class role in Fairly Secret Army (1984-86).

Child appeared in the 2004 film Wimbledon and television drama Judge John Deed. He also appeared in Doctors for one episode, and most recently appeared as David Walsh in EastEnders. Child played the British Foreign Secretary three times in his career.

Politics
In 1993, Child appeared in a party political broadcast for the Labour Party which also starred Hugh Laurie and Stephen Fry.

Personal life
Child was married three times, his first wife being the actress Deborah Grant, by whom he had a daughter. His second wife was Jan Todd, daughter of actor Bernard Todd, by whom he had a son and a daughter. He had a daughter and a son from his third marriage to publisher Elizabeth Morgan, daughter of Rev. Grenville Morgan, of Canterbury, Kent. He lived in Ewelme, Oxfordshire. Child died after a long illness on 7 March 2022, at the age of 77.

Filmography

References

External links
 

1944 births
2022 deaths
Alumni of Bristol Old Vic Theatre School
Baronets in the Baronetage of the United Kingdom
English male film actors
English male soap opera actors
People educated at Eton College
People from Woking
Labour Party (UK) people
Alumni of Aiglon College